Alan Sonfist is a New York City based American artist best known as a "pioneer" and a "trailblazer" of the Land or Earth Art movement.

He first gained prominence for his "Time Landscape" found on the corner of West Houston Street and LaGuardia Place in New York City's Greenwich Village. Proposed in 1965, "Time Landscape" the environmental sculpture took over ten years of careful planning with New York City. It was eventually landmarked by the city. It has often been cited as the first urban forest of its kind. More recently, Sonfist has continued to create artworks within the natural landscape, inaugurating a one-acre (4,000 m2) landscape project titled "The Lost Falcon of Westphalia" on Prince Richard's estate outside Cologne, Germany in 2005.

In Nature: The End of Art, environmentalist Jonathan Carpenter writes that "To review the public sculptures of Alan Sonfist since the 1960s is to witness the reemergence of the socially aware artist.  His sculptures reassert the historical role of the artist as an active initiator of ideas within society.  Each of his artworks fundamentally redefine what sculpture is, who the artist is, and how art should function for its public."

Life and career

Sonfist was raised in the South Bronx. His work derives from an early childhood anxiety towards deforestation.  As the Financial Times writes: "One of the pioneers of environmental art, Sonfist's passion for nature was triggered by his childhood nearby a hemlock forest, which has now died. 'I watched it disappear as people tried to improve upon it,' he tells me sadly. A gentle soul in a pinstriped suit and straw trilby, he believes nature is safest 'when left to be like it is'."

Attending Ohio State University, he studied with Gestalt psychologist Hoyt Sherman.  His research there concerned the language of visual culture and its relationship with human psychology. He later attended Hunter College, where he received a master's degree in Art.  Later, he went on to pursue a Research Fellowship in visual studies at MIT, Cambridge, MA.

Beginning with his first major commissioned work, "Time Landscapes" in Greenwich Village, NYC, Sonfist received critical acclaim for his innovative use of urban spaces to design havens of nature and green art.  His early work in the 1960s and 1970s helped pioneer the burgeoning movement of site-specific sculpture.  
After his breakthrough Time Landscape of New York, Sonfist gradually built a reputation as a father of the environmental art movement, presenting a new and unique harmony between ecology and artistry.  In 1971, Joshua Taylor, Director of the American Museum of Art, wrote of "Autobiography of Alan Sonfist", a one-person exhibition at the Smithsonian Institution, "...some--like Alan Sonfist ... have reacted to  a cosmic consciousness by returning to specific nature in its smallest detail.  For art in America, the landscape has meant freedom and expansion, or, when useful, discipline and concentration.  But once the artist took possession of his environment, the natural bounty of America was never far from the surface of his art."

His 1971 work, Leaves Met the Paper in Time complemented Time Landscape in its themes. The piece consists of sheets of dyed paper paired with real leaves of the same shade. While the paper retained its color, the leaves lost theirs over time, which Eleanor Heartney explains as "suggesting the apparent triumph of technology over nature while memorializing the original state of the now shriveled leaves."′

His first major publication was on his lecture series at the Metropolitan Museum of Art in 1969.   Sonfist edited "Art in the Land: A Critical Anthology of Environmental Art,"  which was republished in Europe and Asia due to its reception by critics and artists alike.   He has been included in multiple major international exhibition catalogs such as the Dokumenta, the Venice Biennale, and the Paris Biennale. Recently, Dr. Robert Rosenblum wrote an introduction to Sonfist's "Nature: The End of Art" which was distributed by Thames and Hudson, and published by Gil Ori.

Throughout his career, Sonfist has given several keynote speeches for public and private events and organizations such as Pennsylvania State University, the Southern Sculpture Conference, and the American Landscape Association in Miami.  He has been a featured speaker in numerous symposiums at major institutions and conferences including the Metropolitan Museum of Art, the Boston Museum of Fine Arts, the Midwest College Association, the U.N. Ecological Conference in São Paulo, Brazil, and the Berlin Ecology Conference.  Sonfist has been a featured lecturer at numerous major institutions including the Whitney Museum of Art, the Nelson-Atkins Museum of Art, and the Museum of Contemporary Art of Chicago.

In 1987, Sonfist's public art installation, Time Landscape of St. Louis, was ordered unilaterally to be destroyed by Evelyn O. Rice, then director of the St. Louis Department of Parks, Recreation and Forestry, only 17 months after installation. Rice declared the artwork a "public eyesore". While the then infant Regional Arts Commission was contacted about the destruction, Ms Rice did not use the then new public city policy to convene a panel to review the work prior to removal. Rather, she ordered the city's bulldozers to remove the work as soon as possible. This action created news reports into the larger discussion about public art works, city policy and legality.
In the same year he stayed in Italy to carry out his land art project at the Gori Collection, Circles of time

Sonfist has received major awards and grants from private and governmental organizations including the National Endowment for the Arts, the Graham Foundation for Art and Architecture, the Chase Manhattan Bank Foundation, and the U.S. Information Agency.  Sonfist's works are included in  many international public collections such as Skulpturen Park Köln (Cologne Sculpture Park) in Germany and Villa Celle, in Tuscany, Italy.  His work is also featured in  collections of major institutions including Metropolitan Museum of Art, the Dallas Museum of Art, the Princeton University Museum, and the Museum of Modern Art – New York City, The Whitney Museum, and the Ludwig Museum in Aachen, Germany.

Some of his most notable solo exhibitions include "The Autobiography of Alan Sonfist," at the Museum of Fine Arts in Boston, "Alan Sonfist Landscapes" at the Smithsonian American Art Museum, "Trees" at the High Museum in Atlanta, GA, and "Trinity River Project" at the Dallas Museum of Fine Arts.

A few of his commissions include, but are not limited to: "Lost Falcon of Westphalia," commissioned by Prince Richard of Germany, "Time Landscape of Indianapolis," commissioned by the Eiteljorg Museum Of American Indians and Western Art, and "Circles of Time," on the Gori Estate in Florence, Italy, and "Birth by Spear," in Florence. 
Today, he continues to promote sustainable energy and strives to raise awareness for global climate change with his international projects.  Recently, Sonfist collaborated with Green City Planners in Pori, Finland and Tampa, Florida to create green public spaces.

Time Landscape

Sonfist's breakthrough work, Time Landscape, was New York City's first urban forest. The juxtaposition of the pre-Colonial forest inside a modern-day city epitomizes the environmental conscience that Sonfist is known for.

In his essay "The New Economics of Environmental Art," Jeffrey Deitch wrote of the piece:

Alan Sonfist's New York York City-wide Time Landscape (1965-1978), most visible to the art world in its segment at the corner of La Guardia Place and Houston Street (1978), is an example of the artwork as a major urban-design plan. This ambitious and carefully researched undertaking consists of a network of sites throughout New York City's five boroughs, where sections of land have been restored to the way they might have appeared in the seventeenth century, before the advent of urbanization. Sonfist spent over ten years developing the project and finally pushing it to fruition. To complete the La Guardia Place site, he had to weave his way through community groups, local politicians, real estate interests, several arms of city government, art patrons, and their lawyers. It was only after shaping alliances with influential neighborhood politicians and agreeing to important compromises with community groups that Sonfist finally brought Time Landscape to completion ... Sonfist managed all of this without a patron or a sponsoring organization.

Current Works

Alan Sonfist's more recent works include the Circles of Life, in Kansas City, the Disappearing Forest of Germany, in Cologne, and the Endangered Species of New England in Lincoln, Massachusetts, part of the deCordova Museum and Sculpture Park.

In 2017, Sonfist completed his Island of Paradise—in collaboration with architect Marco Brizzi and ecologist Carlo Scoccianti—in Tuscany, Italy:

Today, Sonfist continues to promote his message of ecological sustainability and timeless respect for the fragility of nature in each of his green art projects.

Legacy

"The concept of a year round natural microcosmic forest, which would contain plants and trees indigenous to pre-colonial New York is fresh and intriguing and is desperately needed for our city." – Ed Koch, Former New York City Mayor

"After making art of quiet distinction for over 30 years, Alan Sonfist suddenly finds himself close to the spotlight. His concern for the fragility of nature, rather than for its sublimeness or monumentality, makes him a forerunner of the new ecological sensibility." – Michael Brenson, New York Times

"Alan is a pioneer of narrative environmental art on a grand scale." -Joshua Taylor, former director of the National Collection of Fine Art

Selected publications

References

External links 

 
 "NATURAL/CULTURAL" Interview with Alan Sonfist by John K. Grande at Green Museum

American artists
Land artists
1946 births
Living people